The 2022 Judo Grand Slam Abu Dhabi was held at the Jiu-Jitsu Arena in Abu Dhabi, United Arab Emirates, from 21 to 23 October 2022 as part of the IJF World Tour and during the 2024 Summer Olympics qualification period.

Medal summary

Men's events

Women's events

Source Results

Medal table

Prize money
The sums written are per medalist, bringing the total prizes awarded to €154,000.

References

External links
 

2022 IJF World Tour
2022 Judo Grand Slam
Judo
Judo
Grand Slam Abu Dhabi 2022
Judo